The 1945–46 Chicago Black Hawks season was the teams 20th season in the National Hockey League, and they were coming off a disappointing season in 1944–45, failing to qualify for the playoffs.

With Doug Bentley, Max Bentley, and Red Hamill returning to the team after World War II, the Black Hawks would set a team record by scoring 200 goals, which also led the NHL.  The Hawks allowed 178, which ranked them 4th.  The Hawks would finish the season with a 23–20–7 record, good for 53 points, which was their highest total since the 1934–35 season, and they would finish in 3rd place in the NHL.

Offensively, the Hawks were led by Max Bentley, who scored a team high 31 goals, and had an NHL high 61 points, while winning the Hart Trophy.  Clint Smith had a solid season, registering 50 points, while Bill Mosienko would have 48.  Doug Bentley missed 14 games due to injuries, but still finished with 40 points.  Team captain John Mariucci would lead the Hawks defensemen with 11 points, and have a team high 58 penalty minutes.

In goal, Mike Karakas would get a majority of the action, earning a career high 22 wins, while posting a 3.46 GAA and a shutout along the way.

The 3rd seeded Hawks would face the 1st place team, the Montreal Canadiens, in a best of 7 series in the opening round of the playoffs.  Montreal finished 8 points ahead of the Hawks, and had recently swept Chicago in the 1944 Stanley Cup Finals.  The Canadiens once again proved to be too much for the Hawks to handle, as they blew out the Hawks in each of the 4 games they played to sweep the series.

Season standings

Record vs. opponents

Game log

Regular season

Playoffs

Montreal Canadiens 4, Chicago Black Hawks 0

Season stats

Scoring leaders

Goaltending

Playoff stats

Scoring leaders

Goaltending

References
SHRP Sports
The Internet Hockey Database
National Hockey League Guide & Record Book 2007
Notes

Chicago Blackhawks seasons
Chicago
Chicago